Sandava is a genus of moths of the family Erebidae. The genus was erected by Francis Walker in 1863.

Species
Sandava micrastigma (Kaye, 1901) Trinidad
Sandava scitisignata (Walker, 1862) Queensland
Sandava silvicola (Holloway, 1977) Norfolk Island
Sandava xylistis C. Swinhoe, 1900 Australia

References

Calpinae
Moth genera